Where I'm From may refer to:

 "Where I'm From" (Jason Michael Carroll song), 2008
 "Where I'm From" (Lukas Graham song), 2020
 "Where I'm From" (Passion song), 1996
 "Where I'm From" (The Reklaws song), 2020
 Where I'm From (film), a 2014 National Film Board of Canada documentary by Claude Demers